Fernando Fadeuille Carvallo (born 10 May 1974, in Montevideo) is a retired French-Uruguayan footballer.

External links
 Player profile 
 

1974 births
Living people
Uruguayan footballers
Association football midfielders
Apollon Limassol FC players
Defensor Sporting players
Montevideo Wanderers F.C. players
Peñarol players
Liverpool F.C. (Montevideo) players
Millonarios F.C. players
Uruguayan Primera División players
Categoría Primera A players
Cypriot First Division players
Expatriate footballers in Colombia
Expatriate footballers in Cyprus
Uruguayan people of French descent